The 1964–65 Ranji Trophy was the 31st season of the Ranji Trophy, the premier first-class cricket tournament that took place in India between September 1965 and April 1965. Bombay won their seventh consecutive title defeating Hyderabad in the final.

Highlights
Mysore was out for 46 against Madras, their lowest score since being out for 28 against Bombay in 1951–52 (as of 2020).

Group stage

South Zone

North Zone

East Zone

West Zone

Central Zone

Knockout stage

Final
Hyderabad made two changes in their side that beat Uttar Pradesh in the semi-final. All-rounder Iftikharuddin and Sultan Saleem were included in place of R. H. Sabir and Kaleem-ul-Haq.

References

External links
 Ranji Trophy, 1964-65 at ESPN Cricinfo archive
 

1965 in Indian cricket
Ranji Trophy seasons
Domestic cricket competitions in 1964–65